Coleg Morgannwg (English: Glamorgan College) is a former further education college located at four main campuses across Rhondda Cynon Taf, Wales. In 2013, Coleg Morgannwg merged with Ystrad Mynach College to become Coleg y Cymoedd.

The college's main campuses were located in Aberdare  Nantgarw  Pontypridd  and Llwynypia  The college also operated a number of outreach centres within local communities. Courses offered by the college included NVQs, GCSEs, BTECs, A levels and access courses.

Notable alumni
 Derek Brockway - BBC Wales Meteorologist and TV presenter

External links

 Coleg Morgannwg homepage

Further education colleges in Rhondda Cynon Taf